The  is an art museum founded in 1989. It is in Hijiyama Park in Hiroshima, Japan. The building was designed by architect Kisho Kurokawa.

Representative collections

Access
Hiroden Hijiyama-shita Station

See also
Hiroshima Museum of Art
Hiroshima Prefectural Art Museum

External links

Museums in Hiroshima
Art museums established in 1989
Contemporary art galleries in Japan
Modernist architecture in Japan
Art museums and galleries in Japan
1989 establishments in Japan
Kisho Kurokawa buildings